Madobi is a Local Government Area in Kano State, Nigeria. Its headquarters are in the town of Madobi.

It has an area of 273 km² and a population of 136,623 at the 2006 census.

The postal code of the area is 711.

References

Local Government Areas in Kano State